Bademli is a village in Ödemiş district of İzmir Province, Turkey. It is situated to the south of Ödemiş and in the irrigation area of  Küçükmenderes River (Cayster of the antiquity) . The population of Bademli is 2801. as of 2012. Bademli was declared a seat of township in 1932. Main economic activity is agriculture. Cherries and other fruits are produced. The village is one of the important centers of arboriculture. There is also some light industry in the village, such as olive mills and mineral water installations.

References

Villages in Ödemiş District